Leobardo López García (born 4 September 1983) is a Mexican professional footballer who plays as a centre-back for Liga de Expansión MX club Celaya.

He received first cap at the friendly match against China on April 16, 2008. He scored his first goal with Mexico against Ecuador and also added an assist to the winning goal, the result was 2–1.

Honours
Pachuca
Mexican Primera División: Clausura 2007
CONCACAF Champions' Cup: 2007, 2008
Copa Sudamericana: 2006
North American SuperLiga: 2007

Monterrey
CONCACAF Champions League: 2012–13

Veracruz
Copa MX: Clausura 2016

Necaxa
Supercopa MX: 2018

Career statistics

International

International goals

|-
| 1. || November 12, 2008 || Phoenix, United States ||  || 2–1 || Win || Friendly
|}

References

External links
 
 
 

1983 births
Living people
Association football defenders
Footballers from Michoacán
Mexican footballers
Liga MX players
Ascenso MX players
C.F. Pachuca players
Club León footballers
C.F. Monterrey players
Club Atlético Zacatepec players
C.D. Veracruz footballers
Club Necaxa footballers
Club Celaya footballers
Mexico international footballers
2013 CONCACAF Gold Cup players